The Sablatnig N.I was a bomber aircraft developed in Germany during the First World War, a development of the Sablatnig C.I adapted for night operations.

Development
The N.1 was a two-bay biplane of conventional design, with staggered wings, two open cockpits in tandem, and fixed, tailskid undercarriage. At least eight aircraft were built during the war and converted to P.I standard after the Armistice.

After the Armistice Sablatnig developed the P.I. Adding a cabin for four passengers, the P.I was one of the few aircraft approved by the ILÜK (Interallierte Luftfahrt-Überwachungs-Kommission, Inter-allied Aviation Control Commission) for production in Germany.

Variants

N.I Two-seat night-bomber / attack aircraft with limited production, (at least eight).
P.I A four-seat, plus pilot, airliner produced by direct conversion of eight N.I airframes with at least seven more aircraft built as P.Is

Operational history
Despite limited, if any, use by the Imperial German Army Air service, those N.Is that were built were converted to civilian standards as P.Is and operated chiefly by Danish Air Express and Lloyd Luftverkehr Sablatnig.

Specifications (N.I)

References

Bibliography

1910s German bomber aircraft
N.1
Biplanes
Single-engined tractor aircraft
Aircraft first flown in 1918